Alterraun Ennis Verner (born December 13, 1988) is a former American football cornerback. He played college football for the University of California, Los Angeles (UCLA). He was drafted by the Tennessee Titans in the fourth round of the 2010 NFL Draft. He has also played for the Tampa Bay Buccaneers and Miami Dolphins.

High school career
Verner attended Mayfair High School in Lakewood, California, where he played wide receiver, defensive back, linebacker, and special teams. As a senior, he had 50 receptions for 907 yards and 13 touchdowns. On defense, he made 56 tackles and four interceptions (one returned for a 102-yard touchdown). Verner earned second-team All-CIF Southern Section honors and was selected to play in Shrine All-Star Game. He played for legendary coach Andrew Slome.

Verner also lettered all four seasons in track & field for coach Josh Barker. Prior to high school, Verner won a silver medal in the 1500 meters at the 1997 California State Game, and placed fourth in the 4×100 relay at the 2000 USATF Youth Nationals. As a freshman at Mayfair, he was selected as the team's Most Valuable Performer, and was the league champ in both the 110m and 300m hurdle (45.0) events. As a sophomore, he was the league champ in 4x400 relay, second in 110m high hurdles and high jump (6-2). As a junior, he served as team co-captain, earning Suburban League Academic All-League honors. He was the league champ in the high jump (6-4) and  relay. As a senior, he had bests of 6-6 (1.98m) in the high jump, 20-10 (6.37m) in the long jump, 10.7 in the 100-meter dash and 39.70 in the 300m hurdles.

An excellent student, Verner held a 4.17 GPA and achieved a 1740 SAT score. He also served as a peer tutor to his high school football team in the subjects of math and history. Considered a three-star recruit by Rivals.com, Verner was listed as the No. 49 cornerback prospect in the nation. He chose UCLA over Boston College, Oregon, and Washington.

College career
In his true freshman year at UCLA, Verner finished fourth among Bruins with 59 tackles and third on the team with two interceptions, while leading the team with 123 interception yards and two touchdowns. He was named co-Freshman of the Year for the Pac-10 Conference (alongside Jairus Byrd and Taylor Mays), and was selected first-team Freshman All-America by College Football News and Scripps/FWAA, as well as second-team by The Sporting News, Scout.com, and Rivals.com.

As a sophomore, Verner appeared in all 13 games, while starting 10, and ranked fourth on the team with 75 tackles. He finished with 15 pass breakups and four interceptions. In his junior year, Verner was a starter in all 12 games, and was second on the team in tackles with 73. He was selected to the second-team All-Pac-10 squad chosen by the league's coaches.

In November 2009, Verner was named one of the twelve semifinalists for the 2009 Jim Thorpe Award.

In his senior year, he started in all 13 games and finished with 72 tackles, of which 51 were solo. He also had five interceptions and 158 interception return yards, with one of them resulting in a touchdown. He also had another defensive touchdown as a fumble recovery.

In 2011, Verner returned to UCLA during the NFL off-season to complete his Bachelor of Science degree in mathematics. He graduated later that year with a degree in mathematics/applied science.

Professional career
Verner attended the NFL Scouting Combine and performed all of the combine and positional drills. On March 30, 2010, he attended UCLA's pro day and ran all of the combine drills again, but opted to skip the short shuttle and three-cone drill. He was able to earn better times in the 40-yard dash (4.52s) and 20-yard dash (2.63s), while also adding height to his vertical (32.5"). At the conclusion of the pre-draft process, he was projected to be a fourth or fifth round pick by NFL draft experts and scouts. He was ranked as the 18th best cornerback prospect in the draft by DraftScout.com and was also ranked the 24th best cornerback prospect in the draft by WalterFootball.com.

Tennessee Titans
The Tennessee Titans selected Verner in the fourth round (104th overall) of the 2010 NFL Draft. He was the 13th cornerback drafted in 2010. The Tennessee Titans traded running back LenDale White, defensive tackle Kevin Vickerson, their fourth round pick (111th overall) in 2010, and their sixth round pick (185th overall) in 2010 to the Seattle Seahawks in exchange for the Seahawks' fourth (104th overall) and sixth round picks (176th overall) in the 2010 NFL Draft. The Titans selected quarterback Rusty Smith with their sixth round pick, while Seattle drafted Walter Thurmond and Anthony McCoy.

2010
On June 15, 2010, the Tennessee Titans signed Verner to a four-year, $3.16 million contract and also include a signing bonus of $790,035.

Throughout training camp, Verner competed for a job as a starting cornerback against veterans Jason McCourty and Ryan Mouton. Head coach Jeff Fisher named Verner the third cornerback on the depth chart to start the regular season, behind veterans Cortland Finnegan and Jason McCourty.

He made his professional regular season debut in the Tennessee Titans' season-opener against the Oakland Raiders and was credited with two tackles in their 38–13 victory. The following week, Verner and teammate Patrick Bailey tackled Antonio Brown during an 18-yard return for Verner's first physical tackle of his career during a 19–11 loss to the Pittsburgh Steelers. He finished the game with two combined tackles. On October 3, 2010, Verner earned his first career start after Jason McCourty suffered a broken right forearm the previous week and would have to undergo surgery. McCourty missed the next four games (Weeks 4–7). Verner finished his first start with a season-high 11 solo tackles and three pass deflections during a 26–20 loss to the Denver Broncos. The following week, Verner made nine combined tackles, a pass deflection, and made his first career interception off a pass by Tony Romo in the Titans' 34–27 victory at the Dallas Cowboys in Week 5. His interception occurred in the fourth quarter off a screen pass originally intended for tight end Martellus Bennett. In Week 14, Verner collected 12 combined tackles (ten solo) in the Titans' 30–28 loss to the Indianapolis Colts. The following week, Verner made ten combined tackles (four solo), deflected a pass, and intercepted a pass by Matt Schaub during a 31–17 victory to the Houston Texans. He finished his rookie season with 101 combined tackles (85 solo), 11 pass deflections, three interceptions, and a forced fumble in 16 games and 12 starts.

2011
On January 28, 2011, the Tennessee Titans announced the firing of head coach Jeff Fisher after they finished fourth in the AFC South with a 6–10 record in 2010. Defensive coordinator Jerry Gray held a competition between Verner and McCourty to name a starting cornerback. Head coach Mike Munchak named Verner the third cornerback on the depth chart to begin the season, behind Cortland Finnegan and Jason McCourty.

In Week 2, Verner made one tackle, broke up a pass, and intercepted quarterback Joe Flacco in the Titans' 26–13 victory against the Baltimore Ravens. On December 11, 2011, Verner collected a season-high 11 combined tackles (nine solo) during a 22–17 loss to the New Orleans Saints in Week 14. Verner finished the  season with 49 combined tackles (43 solo), eight pass deflections, and an interception in 16 games and three starts.

2012
Verner entered training camp in 2012 slated as a starting cornerback after Cortland Finnegan departed in free agency. Head coach Mike Munchak officially named Verner and McCourty the starting cornerbacks to open the regular season, ahead of Ryan Mouton and Coty Sensabaugh.

He started the Tennessee Titans' season-opener against the New England Patriots and recorded nine combined tackles in their 34–13 loss. The following week, Verner collected six combined tackles, two pass deflections, and intercepted a pass by Philip Rivers during a 38–10 loss at the San Diego Chargers in Week 2. On December 30, 2012, Verner collected a season-high ten combined tackles (eight solo) in the Titans' 38–20 victory against the Jacksonville Jaguars in Week 17. He finished the  season with 81 combined tackles (64 solo), nine pass deflections, two interceptions, and a forced fumble in 16 games and 16 starts. The Tennessee Titans did not qualify for the playoffs for the third consecutive season after finishing last in their division with a 6–10 record.

2013
During minicamp, defensive coordinator Jerry Gray chose to try Verner at free safety. He returned to his job at starting cornerback in training camp and saw minor competition from Coty Sensabaugh, Blidi Wreh-Wilson, and Tommie Campbell. Head coach Mike Munchak retained Verner and McCourty as the starting cornerback duo to open the 2013 season.

He started in the Tennessee Titans' season-opener at the Pittsburgh Steelers and recorded three combined tackles, two pass deflections, and an interception in their 16–9 victory. In Week 2, he made six combined tackles, a season-high three pass deflections, an interception, and scored his first career touchdown in the Titans' 30–24 loss at the Houston Texans. During the fourth quarter, Verner intercepted a pass by quarterback Matt Schaub, that was intended for DeAndre Hopkins, and returned it 23-yards to mark the first touchdown of his career. On September 29, 2013, Verner recorded two tackles, two pass deflections, and intercepted two pass attempts by Geno Smith in their 38–13 victory. It marked Verner's first game of his career with multiple interceptions. On December 8, 2013, Verner collected a season-high nine combined tackles and broke up two passes in the Titans' 51–28 loss at the Denver Broncos in Week 14.

On December 27, 2013, Verner was announced as one of the players voted to the 2014 Pro Bowl. It marked Verner's first career Pro Bowl selection. He was voted second-team All-Pro and became the first Titans player to be selected for the Pro Bowl since 2010. He finished the  season with 57 combined tackles (49 solo), a career-high 22 pass deflections, a career-high five interceptions, and a touchdown in 16 games and 16 starts. Pro Football Focus gave Verner the 12th highest overall grade among cornerbacks in 2013.

On March 3, 2014, it was reported by the Tennessean that the Tennessee Titans elected to not use their franchise tag on Alterraun Verner. The Titans and Verner attempted to work on a long-term deal, but were unable to agree to terms on a contract.

Verner was considered as a top free agent and reportedly drew interest from multiple teams, including the New York Jets, Pittsburgh Steelers, Tampa Bay Buccaneers, Minnesota Vikings, and the Detroit Lions among others.

Tampa Bay Buccaneers
On March 11, 2014, the Tampa Bay Buccaneers signed Verner to a four-year, $25.75 million contract that includes $14 million guaranteed.

2014
Verner entered training camp slated as the No. 1 cornerback on the Buccaneers' depth chart, replacing recently departed Pro Bowler Darrelle Revis. Verner was sidelined for a portion of training camp and the preseason due to a hamstring injury. Head coach Lovie Smith officially named Verner the starter to begin the regular season, alongside Mike Jenkins.

On October 5, 2014, Verner made a season-high three pass deflections, five combined tackles, and intercepted a pass by Drew Brees during a 37–31 loss at the New Orleans Saints in Week 5. He was sidelined for two games (Weeks 10–11) after suffering a hamstring injury. On December 21, 2014, he collected a season-high nine combined tackles in the Buccaneers' 20–3 loss to the Green Bay Packers in Week 16. He finished his first season with the Tampa Bay Buccaneers with 76 combined tackles (58 solo), nine pass deflections, two interceptions, and two forced fumbles in 14 games and 14 starts.

2015
Defensive coordinator Leslie Frazier retained Alterraun Verner and Johnthan Banks as the starting cornerback duo to start the 2015 regular season. He started the first two regular season games before losing his job to Tim Jennings and was demoted to being the fourth cornerback on the depth chart, behind Tim Jennings, Mike Jenkins, and Johnthan Banks. After losing his job, he began competing against Sterling Moore to be the Buccaneers' nickelback. On November 8, 2015, Verner collected a season-high eight solo tackles, a pass deflection, and intercepted a pass by Eli Manning during a 32–18 loss at the New York Giants in Week 9. He finished his second season with the Tampa Bay Buccaneers with 56 combined tackles (45 solo), four pass deflections, and an interception in 16 games and six starts. He received a career-low overall grade of 42.6 from Pro Football Focus for the season.

2016
On January 6, 2016, it was reported that Buccaneers' general manager Jason Licht fired head coach Lovie Smith after the Buccaneers finished fourth in their division with a 6–10 record. Throughout training camp, he competed for a job as the starting cornerback against Brent Grimes and rookie first round pick Vernon Hargreaves. Defensive coordinator Mike Smith named Verner the starting cornerback, opposite Brent Grimes, to start the regular season. He started the first two games, but was later demoted to being the fourth cornerback on Tampa Bay's depth chart. He was listed on the depth chart behind Brent Grimes, Vernon Hargreaves, and Jude Adjei-Barimah. In Week 11, he collected a season-high three solo tackles and two pass deflections during a 19–17 win at the Kansas City Chiefs. On November 27, 2016, Verner chose to play in the Buccaneers' Week 12 matchup against the Seattle Seahawks after having his father die two days prior from a sudden heart attack. He finished the Bucs' 14–5 victory with two combined tackles, two pass deflections, and intercepted a pass by Russell Wilson. He finished the  season with 16 combined tackles (15 solo), seven pass deflections, and an interception in 16 games and three starts. Pro Football Focus gave him an overall grade of 76.6, ranking 48th among all qualified cornerbacks in 2016.

2017
On February 23, 2017, the Tampa Bay Buccaneers released Verner to clear $6.5 million in cap space.

Miami Dolphins
On July 25, 2017, the Miami Dolphins signed Verner to a one-year, $980,000 contract with an $80,000 signing bonus.

Throughout training camp, he competed for a job as a starting cornerback against Xavien Howard, Byron Maxwell, Bobby McCain, Tony Lippett, and Cordrea Tankersley. Head coach Adam Gase named Verner the fourth cornerback on the Dolphins' depth chart to start the season, behind Xavien Howard, Byron Maxwell, and Bobby McCain.

On November 26, 2017, Verner recorded a season-high three solo tackles during a 35–17 loss at the New England Patriots. In Week 14, he  had a season-high two pass deflections and three combined tackles in the Dolphins' 27–20 win against the New England Patriots. He finished the  season with 15 combined tackles (12 solo) and four pass deflections in 16 games and two starts. Pro Football Focus gave Verner an overall grade of 50.7 for the 2017 season.

Retirement
On March 18, 2019, Verner announced his retirement from the NFL. On April 16, 2019, Verner signed a one-day contract to retire as a Tennessee Titan.

NFL career statistics

References

External links
Tennessee Titans bio 
Tampa Bay Buccaneers bio*

1988 births
Living people
American football cornerbacks
Miami Dolphins players
People from Lakewood, California
Players of American football from California
Sportspeople from Los Angeles County, California
Sportspeople from Orange, California
Tampa Bay Buccaneers players
Tennessee Titans players
UCLA Bruins football players
Unconferenced Pro Bowl players